Okuklje  is a village in Croatia. 

Populated places in Dubrovnik-Neretva County
Mljet